Saginaw Seaplane Base  is a privately owned public-use seaplane base located at Saginaw Bay, Alaska. As per Federal Aviation Administration records, the airport had 418 passenger boardings (enplanements) in calendar year 2010, an increase of 27% from the 330 enplanements in 2009.

Facilities 
Saginaw Seaplane Base has one seaplane landing area designated NW/SE measuring 10,000 by 1,000 feet (3,048 x 305 m).

References

External links
 FAA Alaska airport diagram (GIF)
 Topographic map from USGS The National Map

Airports in the Prince of Wales–Hyder Census Area, Alaska
Seaplane bases in Alaska